Puy-Malsignat is a commune in the Creuse department in the Nouvelle-Aquitaine region in central France.

Geography

The Voueize forms part of the commune's eastern border.

Population

Sights
 The church, dating from the thirteenth century.
 The ruins of an eleventh-century castle.
 The château de Margeleix, dating from the seventeenth century.
 The chapel at Vallensanges

See also
Communes of the Creuse department

References

Communes of Creuse